The 2000 Silverstone 500 USA Challenge was the third round of the 2000 American Le Mans Series season.  It took place at Silverstone Circuit, United Kingdom, on May 13, 2000.

This event was the first American Le Mans Series race held outside of North America.  It served as a precursor to the creation of the European Le Mans Series by gauging the willingness of European teams from the FIA Sportscar Championship and FIA GT Championship to participate in a series identical to the American Le Mans Series.  This event also shared the weekend at Silverstone with an FIA GT round, with some GT teams running both events.

Race results
Class winners in bold.

Statistics
 Pole Position - #0 Team Rafanelli - 1:37.030
 Fastest Lap - #0 Team Rafanelli - 1:39.748
 Distance - 503.744 km
 Average Speed - 172.607 km/h

References

Silverstone
Silverstone 500
6 Hours of Silverstone